Martin Štrbák (born January 15, 1975) is a Slovak former ice hockey defenceman, who last played for HC Košice.

Biography
Štrbák played in the 1989 Quebec International Pee-Wee Hockey Tournament with a youth ice hockey team from Czechoslovakia. He was drafted by the Los Angeles Kings in the 9th round of the 1993 NHL Entry Draft, and also played for the Pittsburgh Penguins in the (2003–04) season.

Štrbák was part of the Slovakian team which won the 2002 IIHF World Championships. 

Štrbák was a player for the Lokomotiv Yaroslavl teams which won back-to-back Russian Super League championships in 2002 and 2003.  He formerly played for HC Pardubice in the Czech Extraliga and Metallurg Magnitogorsk of the former Russian Super League.

Career statistics

Regular season and playoffs

International

References

External links
 
 

1975 births
HC CSKA Moscow players
HC MVD players
HC Dynamo Pardubice players
Metallurg Magnitogorsk players
Lokomotiv Yaroslavl players
Slovak ice hockey defencemen
Living people
Los Angeles Kings draft picks
Los Angeles Kings players
Pittsburgh Penguins players
HC Košice players
HC Litvínov players
HC Slovan Bratislava players
Sportspeople from Prešov
Ice hockey players at the 2006 Winter Olympics
Ice hockey players at the 2010 Winter Olympics
Olympic ice hockey players of Slovakia
Slovak expatriate ice hockey players in Russia
VHK Vsetín players
Slovak expatriate ice hockey players in the Czech Republic
Slovak expatriate ice hockey players in the United States
Slovak expatriate ice hockey players in Finland
Slovak expatriate ice hockey players in Sweden